Colehill is a village and townland in south-east County Longford, Ireland. Its Irish name was historically anglicised as Knocknagoal and Knocknagole.

It lies on the R399 regional road.

References

See also
 List of towns and villages in Ireland

Towns and villages in County Longford